The Melvin Mooney Distinguished Technology Award is a professional award conferred by the American Chemical Society, Rubber Division.  Established in 1983, the award is named after Melvin Mooney, developer of the Mooney viscometer and of the Mooney-Rivlin hyperelastic law.  The award consists of an engraved plaque and prize money.  The medal honors individuals "who have exhibited exceptional technical competency by making significant and repeated contributions to rubber science and technology".

Recipients

1980s
 1982 J. Roger Beatty - Senior Research Fellow at B. F. Goodrich known for development of rubber testing instruments and methods
 1983 Aubert Y. Coran - Monsanto researcher responsible for invention of thermoplastic elastomer Geolast
 1984 Eli M. Dannenberg - Cabot scientist known for contributions to surface chemistry of carbon black 
 1985 William M. Hess - Columbian Chemicals Company scientist known for contributions to characterization of carbon black dispersion in rubber
 1986 Albert M. Gessler - ExxonMobil researcher known for development of elastomeric thermoplastics
 1987 Avrom I. Medalia - Cabot scientist known for contributions to understanding electrical conductivity and dynamic properties of carbon black filled rubbers
 1988 John G. Sommer - GenCorp scientist and author of popular texts on rubber technology
 1989 Joginder Lal - Goodyear Polymer Research Manager and expert in the synthesis and mechanism of the formation of high polymers.

1990s
 1990 Gerard Kraus - Phillips Petroleum Scientist known for developing testing standard for carbon black surface area 
 1991 Charles S. Schollenberger - B. F. Goodrich chemist who invented Estane
 1992 Robert W. Layer - B. F. Goodrich chemist noted for contributions to chemistry of imines
 1993 John R. Dunn - Polysar synthetic rubber research chemist 
 1994 Noboru Tokita - Uniroyal and later Cabot scientist known for studying processing of elastomers
 1995 Edward N. Kresge - Exxon Chief Polymer Scientist who developed tailored molecular weight density EPDM elastomers
 1997 Russell A. Livigni - Gencorp scientist known for discovery and development of barium-based catalysts for the polymerization of butadiene and its copolymerization with styrene to give high trans rubbers with low vinyl content
 1998 Henry Hsieh - Phillips Petroleum scientist known for contributions to polymerization chemistry
 1999 Avraam I. Isayev -  University of Akron Distinguished Professor of Polymer Science known for widely used texts on rheology and polymer molding technology, as well as for development of technology for ultrasonic devulcanization of tire rubber.

2000s
 2000 Joseph Kuczkowski - Goodyear chemist who elucidated mechanisms of antioxidant function, resulting in the commercialization of several new antioxidant systems 
 2002 C. Michael Roland - Naval Research Lab scientist recognized for blast and impact protection using elastomers, and for diverse contributions to elastomer science 
 2003 Walter H. Waddell - Exxon scientist recognized for his work on tire innerliner technology
 2004 Oon Hock Yeoh - Freudenberg Scientist known for contributions to nonlinear elasticity and fracture mechanics
 2005 Kenneth F. Castner - Senior Research and Development Associate at Goodyear Tire & Rubber Company known for his work in nickel catalyzed diene polymerization for the synthesis of high cis-polybutadiene
 2006 Meng-Jaio Wang - Cabot scientist known for studies of carbon black
 2007 Daniel L. Hertz Jr. - President of Seals Eastern and NASA consultant on the Space Shuttle Challenger disaster
 2008 Robert P. Lattimer - Lubrizol Advanced Materials research and development technical fellow
 2009 Frederick Ignatz-Hoover - Eastman technology fellow and 9th editor of Rubber Chemistry and Technology

2010s
 2010 William J. van Ooij - University of Cincinnati professor known for elucidating the mechanisms of brass-rubber adhesion in tires
 2011 P.S. Ravishankar - Exxon Senior Staff Engineer recognized for development of Vistalon EPDM elastomers
 2012 Robert Schuster - former director of the German Institute for Rubber Technology (DIK) and popular lecturer on rubber technology
 2014 Shingo Futamura - Materials scientist noted for his concept of the Deformation Index 
 2015 Alan H. Muhr - TARRC scientist noted for contributions to understanding the mechanics elastomer applications, including laminated rubber isolators, marine fenders, automotive mounts, and structural energy dissipation systems
 2016 Dane Parker - Goodyear Tire & Rubber Company researcher known for developing a single-step process for converting Nitrile latex to HNBR latex
 2017 David J. Lohse  ExxonMobil Materials Scientist known for contributions on thermodynamics of mixing, nanocomposites for controlling permeability, neutron scattering of polymers, rheology of polymers 
 2018 Joseph Padovan - University of Akron Distinguished Professor known for pioneering finite element procedures for analysis of rolling tires.
 2019 Manfred Klüppel - German Institute for Rubber Technology department head of Material Concepts and Modeling group

2020s
 2020 Kenneth T. Gillen - Sandia National Labs researcher noted for contributions to service life prediction methods for elastomers
 2021 Howard Colvin -  Organic chemist and consultant to the tire and rubber industries noted for developments to rubber chemicals and polymers
 2022 Anil K. Bhowmick - University of Houston professor known for contributions to polymer nanocomposites, thermoplastic elastomers, sustainability, adhesion, failure and degradation of rubbers and rubber technology
 2023 Anke Blume - engineering technology professor at the University of Twente known for her contributions to silica and silane chemistry for rubber applications.

See also 
 International Rubber Science Hall of Fame: Another ACS award
 Rubber Chemistry and Technology: An ACS journal
 List of chemistry awards
 Sparks-Thomas award
 Charles Goodyear Medal

References

External links
 The ACS Rubber Division
 Oral histories of several medal winners
 Chemical and Engineering News

Awards of the American Chemical Society
Awards established in 1983
Materials science awards
Rubber